Baze University is a private tertiary institution located in Abuja, Nigeria, it was established in 2011, and offers basic standard education. Many Nigerian Politicians bagged their degrees from same university.

History and governance 
The university was established in 2011 and received its provisional license from the National Universities Commission (NUC) on the 7th March of the same year. Academic activities commenced with staff and 17 students all in one building on the site of its 50,000 sqm campus. Construction of the Administrative Block, the Faculty of Law, the Faculty of Computing & Applied Sciences, Faculty of Engineering, Faculty of Environmental Sciences and the Faculty of Medical and Health Sciences soon followed.

In 2021, construction of the University Teaching Hospital commenced and is expected to be completed in the same year. Already, there exists a Library complex, Staff Housing Complex and the students’ Hostel consisting of 2 Blocks for males and females with a capacity for 500 students each. The university has had six consecutive Convocation Ceremonies and has produced graduates in various disciplines.

Academics 
The university offers various academic programmes for undergraduate and post-graduate degrees. A total of 43 undergraduate degree programs  are run at the university under the following faculties:

 Faculty of Management and Social Sciences 
 Faculty of Law 
 Faculty of Computing and Applied Sciences 
 Faculty of Engineering 
 Faculty of Environmental Sciences 
 Faculty of Medical and Health Sciences

While the postgraduate school offers the following degree programs:

 M.Sc. Animal And Environmental Science
 M.Sc. Chemistry
 M.Sc. Computer Science
 M.Sc. Economics
 M.Sc. International Relations And Diplomacy
 M.Sc. Management MMAN
 M.Sc. Mass Communication MMAC
 M.Sc. Parasitology MPAR
 M.Sc. Public Administration
 M.Sc. Sociology MSOC
 M.Sc. Intelligence and Global Security
 M.Sc. Security, Leadership and Society
 Masters of Business Administration (MBA)
 Masters of Law (LLM)

Accreditation and partnerships 
Baze University held its 4th convocation ceremony in 2017 with former president Goodluck Jonathan in attendance

In 2017, the Association of Certified Chartered Accountants (ACCA) got into a collaborative partnership with Baze University to integrate and embed ACCA curriculum into the university curriculum aimed at efforts to grow the number of finance and accounting professionals in the African sub-region.

In 2016, the government of Sokoto state transferred 39 of its indigenes sponsored to study in Dubai from various universities in the United Arab Emirates (UAE) to Baze University, Abuja in a bid to reduce the cost of study sponsorship - a consequence of the Recession.

Notable alumni 

 Osita Chidoka - Past Minister of Aviation in Nigeria
Dino Melaye -  Former Nigerian Senator
Rotimi Amaechi - Former Rivers State Governor and Minister of Transportation

References

External links

Private Nigerian Universities

Educational institutions established in 2011
Universities and colleges in Nigeria
2011 establishments in Nigeria
Private universities and colleges in Nigeria
Education in Abuja